Michael Casey may refer to:

 Michael Casey (poet) (born 1947), American poet
 Michael Casey (academic), professor of music at Dartmouth College
 Michael T. Casey (1902–1997), Irish Dominican priest and chemist
 Michael James Casey (1918–1944), British bomber pilot
 Michael E. Casey (1870–1949), American politician and lawyer in Missouri
 Michael Casey (athlete), Irish racewalker at the 1996 European Race Walking Cup
 Michael "Iceman" Casey, fictional character in Wing Commander franchise
 Michael Casey (Sons of Anarchy), fictional character

See also
 Mike Casey (disambiguation)